Jarmo Kalevi Kärnä (born 4 August 1958 in Valtimo) is a retired Finnish long jumper, best known for his bronze medal at the 1992 European Indoor Championships. His personal best was 8.16 metres, achieved in June 1989 in Riga. This mark tied (with Rainer Stenius) for the Finnish record until 2005, when it was eclipsed in the qualification round of the World Championships long jump by Tommi Evilä.

Achievements

External links

1958 births
Living people
People from Valtimo
Finnish male long jumpers
Athletes (track and field) at the 1988 Summer Olympics
Olympic athletes of Finland
Sportspeople from North Karelia